Lorvão is a parish in Penacova Municipality, Portugal. The population in 2011 was 3,898, in an area of 26.95 km². Within the Parish of Lorvão are the following places and towns: Foz do Caneiro, Caneiro, São Mamede, Aveleira, Roxo, Paradela do Lorvão, Chelo, Rebordosa.

See also
Apocalypse of Lorvão

References

External links

  

Freguesias of Penacova